Eugène-Louis Lequesne (or Le Quesne) (15 February 1815 – 3 June 1887) was a French sculptor. Lequesne was born and died in Paris.  In 1841, he entered the École nationale des beaux-arts, in James Pradier's workshop. In 1843, he won the second Prix de Rome, and in 1844 the first prize, with a plaster bas-relief entitled Pyrrhus tuant Priam (Pyrrhus killing Priam). He lived at the Académie de France à Rome from 1844 to 1849, alongside Jean-Louis Charles Garnier. In 1855, he was awarded the Great Prize for sculpture at the Exposition Universelle, and received the Légion d'honneur.

Main works
 figures representing Rouen and Amiens, on the façade of the Gare du Nord, Paris, circa 1862
 colossal finial figure of La Bonne Mère (The Good Mother), Notre-Dame de la Garde, Marseille, 1867
 plaster figure of Camulogene, Palais des Beaux-Arts de Lille, 1872
 two Pegasus figures, Palais Garnier, Paris
 Faune Dansant (Dancing Faun), Jardin du Luxembourg, Paris
 La Foi, La Charité et L'Espérance (Faith, Charity and Hope), Église de la Sainte-Trinité, Paris
 two medallions on the façade of the Musée de Picardie in Amiens: Thuillier Constant and Du Cange
 two caryatids on the façade of the Musée de Picardie in Amiens: L'Industrie and La Sculpture
 Masque d’Homère (Mask of Homer), Museum of Beaufort
 Faune Dansant (Dancing Faun), Musée des Beaux-Arts de Bordeaux
 Prêtresse de Bacchus (Priestess of Bacchus), Museum of Cambrai
 À quoi rêvent les jeunes filles (What young girls dream of) and Vercingétorix vaincu défiant les soldats romains (Defeated Vercingetorix defying Roman soldiers), Museum of Chartres
 Le buste de Laënnec (Bust of Laënnec), Faculté de médecine de Paris
 Thuillier, Museum of Roanne
 Le Maréchal de Saint-Arnaud (Marshal Saint-Arnaud), Palace of Versailles
 Renommée retenant Pégase (Renown holding back Pegasus''), Musée d'Orsay, Paris

References

External links
  Works by Lequesne, on Paris Sculptures (photos)
 

1815 births
1887 deaths
French architectural sculptors
Artists from Paris
Prix de Rome for sculpture
19th-century French sculptors
French male sculptors
Chevaliers of the Légion d'honneur
19th-century French male artists